Ayedonitsky (masculine) or Ayedonitskaya (feminine) is a Russian last name. It was artificially created from the Latin word aedon, meaning nightingale and was given in Russian Orthodox seminaries either to students who sang well in a choir or as a Latin translation of the Russian last name Solovyov.

References

Notes

Sources
И. М. Ганжина (I. M. Ganzhina). "Словарь современных русских фамилий" (Dictionary of Modern Russian Last Names). Москва, 2001. 
Ю. А. Федосюк (Yu. A. Fedosyuk). "Русские фамилии: популярный этимологический словарь" (Russian Last Names: a Popular Etymological Dictionary). Москва, 2006. 



Russian-language surnames